Paolo Totò (born 22 January 1991) is an Italian cyclist, who currently rides for UCI Continental team .

Major results

2009
 5th Coppa Città di Offida
2012
 2nd Memorial Elia Da Re
2013
 8th Ruota d'Oro
2014
 3rd Coppa della Pace
 5th Trofeo Internazionale Bastianelli
2016
 3rd Memorial Marco Pantani
2017
 1st Stage 2 Tour of Albania
 2nd GP Laguna
 2nd Banja Luka–Belgrade II
 4th Trofeo Alcide Degasperi
 4th Trofeo Matteotti
 7th GP Kranj
 8th Gran Premio della Costa Etruschi
 9th GP Industria & Artigianato di Larciano
 9th GP Izola
 9th GP Adria Mobil
 9th Coppa della Pace
2018
 1st GP Laguna
 2nd Trofeo Laigueglia
 3rd Overall Tour de Hongrie
 4th Overall Tour of Albania
1st  Points classification
 4th GP Adria Mobil
 7th Giro dell'Appennino
 8th Overall Circuit des Ardennes
 9th GP Izola
2019
 2nd Overall Tour of Szeklerland
1st Points classification
1st Stage 3a (ITT)
 2nd GP Slovenian Istria
 2nd Gemenc Grand Prix I
 2nd GP Kranj
 4th GP Industria & Artigianato di Larciano
 4th La Popolarissima
 6th Gemenc Grand Prix II
 7th Overall Giro del Friuli-Venezia Giulia

References

External links

1991 births
Living people
Italian male cyclists
People from Aosta
Cyclists from Aosta Valley